This Mountain Life is a Canadian documentary film, directed by Grant Baldwin and released in 2018. The film centres on various residents of the Canadian province of British Columbia and their relationships with the province's mountain landscape, including a mother and daughter undertaking a 2,300 kilometre trek through the Coast Mountains, a married couple who have lived off the grid in the mountains for over 50 years, a pair of avalanche survivors and a group of Roman Catholic nuns living at an isolated nunnery in the Garibaldi Ranges.

The film had its theatrical premiere at the 2018 Vancouver International Film Festival.

The film received a Vancouver Film Critics Circle nomination for Best British Columbia Film at the Vancouver Film Critics Circle Awards 2018, and a Canadian Screen Award nomination for Best Cinematography in a Documentary at the 8th Canadian Screen Awards in 2020.

References

External links 
 

2018 films
Canadian documentary films
Films shot in British Columbia
2010s English-language films
2010s Canadian films